Flumedroxone is a steroidal progestogen of the 17α-hydroxyprogesterone group that was never marketed. The C17α acetate ester of flumedroxone, flumedroxone acetate, has been marketed as an antimigraine drug.

References

Trifluoromethyl compounds
Pregnanes
Progestogens
Abandoned drugs